Scott Allen Bolton (born January 4, 1965) is a former wide receiver in the National Football League (NFL).

Biography
Bolton was born Scott Allen Bolton on January 4, 1965, in Mobile, Alabama.

Career
Bolton was drafted by the Green Bay Packers in the twelfth round of the 1988 NFL Draft and played that season with the team. He played at the collegiate level at Auburn University.

See also
List of Green Bay Packers players

References

1965 births
Living people
Sportspeople from Mobile, Alabama
Green Bay Packers players
American football wide receivers
Auburn Tigers football players
Players of American football from Alabama